Adarsh Shastri (born 16 October 1973) is an Indian politician represented Dwarka (Delhi Assembly constituency).

He is former leader of Aam Aadmi Party and Now Leader Of Indian National Congress and a social entrepreneur involved in promotion of education and other social causes.

After serving corporate industry in various MNCs for 17 years, Shastri left his job as the Sales Head at Apple India having the salary package of more than 1 Cr. Rupees per annum to join Aam Aadmi Party with the mission to change politics with the values of transparency and probity as espoused by his grandfather, second Prime Minister of India, Late Lal Bahadur Shastri.

Early life 
Adarsh Shastri is the son of Shri Anil Shastri and Manju Shastri, and is married to Monika Shastri. The couple has twin sons Abhiveer and Abhijai. His father was a former Finance Minister in the Government of India and was elected to the 9th Lok Sabha from Varanasi in 1989. Shastri is an alumnus of St. Columba's School, Delhi and Hindu College, University of Delhi. He has a master's degree in business administration from Lal Bahadur Shastri Institute of Management. He is the grandson of Lal Bahadur Shastri, his father being the second son of Shastri.

Career

Politics
Prior to joining INC, Shastri was looking after overseas organisational affairs as co-convenor of the overseas wing of the Aam Aadmi Party. He is instrumental in building a grassroots base of organisation of AAP.

He contested the 2015 Delhi Legislative Assembly elections from Dwarka (Delhi Assembly constituency) and got 79,729 votes out of around  votes polled, defeating the sitting Member of Legislative Assembly, Pradyumn Rajpoot of the BJP by the margin of 39,366 votes.

Shastri led Delhi Dialogue along with Ashish Khetan, Meera Sanyal, Preeti Sharma Menon. Delhi Dialogue was a point based initiative of Aam Aadmi Party which aimed to make Delhi a world-class city. which aims to build a realistic and practical plan to achieve the vision. Providing free wifi service to Delhi citizen and bringing government on a web through smart governance were part of Delhi Dialogue.

Extending the concept of 'Delhi Dialogue', the Aam Aadmi Party's government constituted Delhi Dialogue Commission in cabinet meeting of Government of National Capital Territory of Delhi chaired by Chief Minister Arvind Kejriwal on Friday approved the setting up of the nine-member Commission.Which later on prepared a 70-point action plan based on dialogues conducted earlier to implement AAP's vision for governance. Shastri is in charge of ambitious Wifi project and various eGovernance initiatives.

Shastri was instrumental in managing organisational affairs of Aam Aadmi Party and as the State Observer for Himachal Pradesh for Mission Vistaar which is being carried out by Aam Aadmi Party for organisation expansion across the nation with the objective to reach out to the multitude of citizens of this country, who share the ideology of the Aam Aadmi Party and want to play a meaningful role in nation building and to reorganize the organisational units at various levels through a bottom-up democratic process.

Shastri has been the Member of National Manifesto Drafting Committee of Aam Aadmi Party for Loksabha Elections 2014 and was also the Incharge of the Manifesto Drafting Committee & Member of Candidate Selection Committee of Uttar Pradesh Chapter of Aam Aadmi Party in Loksabha Elections 2014. He also contested Parliamentary Elections 2014 from Allahabad, Uttar Pradesh as a candidate of the Aam Aadmi Party.

Shastri left his job as the sales head for Apple, India and joined Aam Aadmi Party led by Arvind Kejriwal an anti-corruption activist turned politician. He did not join his father's party since he felt he would not be able to fit into the Congress.

Social 

He has been instrumental in promoting education particularly in every fold. He is member of pioneer organisations
like:
Lal Bahadur Shastri Educational Society as the Member of Board of Governors. Which was established in 1995 with the mission to be a centre of excellence for value based Management and Technology education and research, through continuous learning, societal responsiveness, and strategic partnerships. Lal Bahadur Shastri Educational Society is successfully running institutions like Lal Bahadur Shastri Institute of Management Delhi(considered as one of the top business schools in India.), Lal Bahadur Shastri Institute of Management, Indore and Lal Bahadur Shastri Institute of Management & Technology, Bareilly. Lal Bahadur Shastri Institute of Management, Hyderabad is to be started soon.

 Lal Bahadur Shastri Seva Niketan founded by Late Lalita Shastri is running educational institutions with the objective of providing basic and vocational education to children. Like Lal Bahadur Shastri Polytechnics, Lal Bahadur Shastri Schools & Inter Colleges located at various locations of Uttar Pradesh organisation is continuously spreading in the field. Lal Bahadur Shastri Seva Niketan has recently started Lal Bahadur Shastri Polytechnic, Manda under leadership of Anil Shastri & Adarsh Shastri which is providing State of the Art Infrastructure to establish itself as Centre of Excellence in the field of providing technical education in the region.

Shastri is also a trustee of Lal Bahadur Shastri National Memorial Trust which runs Lal Bahadur Shastri Memorial situated at 1, Motilal Nehru Place, New Delhi where all the amenities of his grandfather are being restored as that were being used by him and his family when they were residing there, including a Fiat car, which his grandfather had bought in instalments from the government and for which he still owed money when he died.1, Motilal Nehru Place is located next to 10 Janpath, the residence of his Grand Father as Prime Minister of India, Lal Bahadur Shastri National Memorial Trust is involved with various socio-cultural activities.

Corporate
Shastri is known in the industry for his unassuming ways and high focus on building lasting relationships with partners.

Shastri has over 17 years of extensive work experience in sales, marketing, key accounts management, business development & strategy in the telecom and retail industry, both in India and abroad as well. He has been involved with the growth of mobile and retail Industry in India and as with any industry in its nascent stage have been one of the pioneers in pushing new sales and distribution norms; and articulating retail and channel development processes.

Shastri is also the National Secretary of Indian Cellular Association, the apex body of the mobile industry comprising Brand Owners; Technology Providers; Manufacturers; National Distributors; Application, Solution and VAS Providers, Ethical Retailers and eminent Consumers of mobile handsets which has been constituted to provide value and service to the mobile cellular handset industry in India by fuelling its growth, improving competitiveness, helping create a legal and ethical market and regulatory environment, thereby providing long term benefits of mobile connectivity to the Indian masses.

Shastri was recently in news to mediate between traders & handset makers to curb online discounts to online sellers like Amazon.com, Flipkart and Snapdeal by brands such as Samsung, Apple and Nokia when India's more than 1.5 lakh small to medium cell phone retailers have been fighting hard to defend themselves against online sellers who are winning over customers by being able to sell phones and tablets at a discount, thus undercutting the brick-and-mortar trade. As the result of this mediation, Nokia, Motorola & HTC had been reasonably open to the idea of price parity between online and retail channels.

Multinational companies which flourished under leadership of Shastri are:
 Apple as sales Head, India (September 2012 – December 2013)
 Samsung Electronics as G.M. & Head, Modern Trade Business, India (March 2007 – September 2012)
 SAGEMCOM as Area Director, South Asia (March 2004 – March 2007)
 Essel Group as Head, Business Development & Operation (January 2001 – March 2004)
 Vodafone Essar India as Manager, Sales Operation (February 1997 – January 2001)

Honours
Shastri has been honoured by the Indian Cellular Association for having pursued the growth of legitimate business and actively building opinion against the grey market in mobile phones.

Alumni and associations
National Secretary, Indian Cellular Association,(ICA)
Trustee, Lal Bahadur Shastri National Memorial Trust
Member of Governing Board, Lal Bahadur Shastri Educational Society
Member of Governing Body, Lal Bahadur Shastri Seva Niketan
Member, The Associated Chambers of Commerce and Industry of India,(ASSOCHAM)
Member, Advisory Cell of Federation of Indian Chambers of Commerce and Industry(FICCI).
Member, Advisory Body of Confederation of Indian Industry(CII).
Member, National Geographic Society, USA

External links

References

Delhi MLAs 2015–2020
1973 births
Living people
Indian anti-corruption activists
Aam Aadmi Party candidates in the 2014 Indian general election
Former members of Aam Aadmi Party from Delhi
Indian National Congress politicians from Delhi